= Cocoa palm =

Cocoa palm could refer to:

- Cocus nucifera, the coconut palm; historically referred to as the cocao-nut palm
- Theobroma cacao, the cocoa tree; the source of cocoa but not a palm
